Asim Ahmed Ademov (born 3 December 1968) is a Bulgarian politician who has served as a Member of the European Parliament 
since 2017. He was re-elected in 2019. In parliament, he has served on the Committee on Civil Liberties, Justice and Home Affairs (2017-2019) and on the Committee on Culture and Education since 2019.

References

1968 births
Living people
MEPs for Bulgaria 2014–2019
MEPs for Bulgaria 2019–2024
GERB MEPs